Esra Kiraz (born 1992) is a Turkish armwrestler. Competing in the senior women's 55 kg category, she has been world and European champion several times in both left and right arm categories.

Early life 
Esra Kiraz was born into a family of sportspeople in 1992. She went to İmam Hatip High School in Kadıköy, Istanbul. 
As of 2012–13 she was a student at Kocaeli University.

She grew up helping her father Ömer Kiraz with floor and wall tiling at his construction site, where she carried  cement bags.

Sports career

Early years 
At school, Kiraz was not a diligent student. She spent more of her time in the school yard. Her teacher of physical education directed her initially to play basketball. In 2006 at age 14, she was selected by her teachers to be sent to an intra-school arm wrestling tournament as no other candidate was available. She took part, and became champion in both left and right arm attracting the attention of a coach of the Istanbul Youth and Sport Directorate, who saw a future world and European champion in her.<ref name="s1"/

In fact she was interested in martial arts, but pursued a career as an armwrestler. Although in the beginning her mother was against her intention, her father fully supported her. Her father accompanied her at trainings, and contributed financially for her participations at international competitions. On the way to the championship, they always walked shoulder to shoulder.

Club career 
Kiraz became Turkish champion in the first official national competition. She competed for Üsküdar Belediye Spor, before she joined Haliç Su Sporları ("Golden Horn Water Sports Club"). During her student time, she competed at the 2013 Turkish Interuniversity Armwrestling Tournament held in Bilecik, and became champion on both arms in the 60 kg category.

In 2014, she became Turkish champion in Kemer, Antalya, where for the first time a great number of sportspeople participated. She was so entitled to take part at the European Championship in Baku, Azerbaijan. Kiraz defended her champion title at the 2015 Turkish Championship in Kemer, Antalya. 
In 2018, she again won the Turkish champion title in both arms of the 50 kg category. She was selected to the national team again following the Turkish Championship held in Eskişehir between 21–25 March 2022.

She is nicknamed "Çelik Bilek" ("The Steel Wrist").

International career 
Kiraz faced her first obstacle when she was about to participate at the 2008 World Championship in Kelowna, British Columbia, Canada. The Turkish Bodybuilding, Fitness and Armwrestling Federation ("Türkiye Vücut Geliştirme, Fitness ve Bilek Güreşi Federasyonu, TVGFBF") did not cover the travel expenses, and she had no sponsors. Her father stepped in selling his work equipment.

She was part of the national team at the 2012 World Championship held in São Vicente, Brazil. After taking many medals and runners-up titles in the Youth and Junior divisions at the world and European championships, she won her first gold medal in the Senior division at the 2011 European Championship in Antalya, Turkey. At the 2015 European Championship in Sofia, Bulgaria, Kiraz competed in the Senior 50 kg category against 13 opponents including some former world and European champions. On the left arm in the final, she lost to her Russian opponent, and took the silver medal. On the right arm in the final, she defeated the Russian, and became European champion. Kiraz took two silver medals at the 2016 World Championship in Blagoevgrad, Bulgaria. She became champion in both arms of the 50 kg at the 2017 World Armwrestling Championship held in Budapest, Hungary. At the 2018 World Championship held in Antalua, Turkey, she won the gold medal in the 50 kg left arm category.

Coaching 
She shared her experience by coaching. Two women, Burcu Korkmaz and Beyzanur Avcı, were coached by Kiraz.

International individual achievements

Honours 
In 2009, she was named the "Armwrestler of the Year" in Turkey.

References 

1992 births
Living people
Sportspeople from Istanbul
Imam Hatip school alumni
Kocaeli University alumni
Female arm wrestlers
Turkish arm wrestlers
Turkish sportswomen